Globalstar, Inc. is an American satellite communications company that operates a low Earth orbit (LEO) satellite constellation for satellite phone and low-speed data communications. The Globalstar second-generation constellation consists of 25 low Earth orbiting (LEO) satellites.

History
The Globalstar project was launched in 1991 as a joint venture of Loral Corporation and Qualcomm. On March 24, 1994, the two sponsors announced the formation of Globalstar LP, a limited partnership established in the U.S., with financial participation from eight other companies, including Alcatel, AirTouch, Deutsche Aerospace, Hyundai, and Vodafone. At that time, the company predicted the system would launch in 1998, based on an investment of $1.8 billion.

Globalstar received its US spectrum allocation from the FCC in January 1995 and continued to negotiate with other nations for rights to use the same radio frequencies in their countries.

The first satellites were launched in February 1998, but system deployment was delayed due to a launch failure in September 1998 that resulted in the loss of 12 satellites in a launch by the Russian Space Agency.

The first call on the original Globalstar system was placed on November 1, 1998, from Qualcomm chairman Irwin Jacobs in San Diego to Loral Space & Communications CEO and chairman Bernard Schwartz in New York City.

In October 1999, the system began "friendly user" trials with 44 of 48 planned satellites. In December 1999, the system began limited commercial service for 200 users with the full 48 satellites (no spares in orbit). In February 2000, it began full commercial service with its 48 satellites and 4 spares in North America, Europe, and Brazil. Another eight satellites were maintained as ground spares. Initial prices were $1.79/minute for satellite phone calls.

On February 15, 2002, the predecessor company Globalstar (old Globalstar) and three of its subsidiaries filed voluntary petitions under Chapter 11 of the United States Bankruptcy Code.

In 2004, restructuring of the old Globalstar was completed. The first stage of the restructuring was completed on December 5, 2003, when Thermo Capital Partners LLC was deemed to obtain operational control of the business, as well as certain ownership rights and risks. Thermo Capital Partners became the principal owner.

Globalstar LLC was formed as a Delaware limited liability company in November 2003 and was converted into Globalstar, Inc., on March 17, 2006.

In 2007, Globalstar launched eight additional first-generation spare satellites into space to help compensate for the premature failure of their in-orbit satellites. Between 2010 and 2013, Globalstar launched 24 second-generation satellites in an effort to restore their system to full service.

Between 2010 and 2011, Globalstar moved its headquarters from Silicon Valley to Covington, Louisiana in part to take advantage of the state's tax breaks and low cost of living.

In April 2018, Globalstar announced it would merge with FiberLight in a deal valued at $1.65 billion. That deal was called off in August 2018 following a lawsuit from Globalstar's largest investor, Mudrick Capital Management.

In March 2020, Globalstar announced that the Third Generation Partnership Project ("3GPP") had approved the 5G variant of Globalstar's Band 53, to become known as n53.

On March 6, 2021, Globalstar announced to customers that the Sat-Fi2 (Satellite Wifi Hotspot) and Sat-Fi2 RAS (Remote Antenna Station) services would be discontinued as of March 12, 2021.

On September 7, 2022, Apple announced a cooperation with Globalstar Inc that "would allow iPhone 14 users to send emergency messages" via satellite, starting in the U.S. and Canada.

Products and services
 
Globalstar is a provider of mobile satellite voice and data services. Globalstar offers these services to commercial and recreational users in more than 120 countries around the world.

The company's products include mobile and fixed satellite telephones, simplex and duplex satellite data modems, and satellite airtime packages.

Many land-based and maritime industries make use of the various Globalstar products and services from remote areas beyond the reach of cellular and landline telephone services. However, many areas of the Earth's surface are left without service coverage, since a satellite requires being in range of an Earth station gateway.

Global customer segments include oil and gas, government, mining, forestry, commercial fishing, utilities, military, transportation, heavy construction, emergency preparedness, and business continuity as well as individual recreational users.

Globalstar data communication services are used for a variety of asset and personal tracking, data monitoring, and SCADA applications.

Satellite messengers
In late 2007, Globalstar subsidiary SPOT LLC launched a handheld satellite messaging and tracking personal safety device known as the SPOT Satellite Messenger. SPOT X, a two-way satellite messenger with GPS location tracking, navigational capabilities, social media linking and direct communication options to emergency services, was launched in 2018.

Simplex data modems
Globalstar STINGR
Globalstar STX2
Globalstar STX3
Globalstar ST100
Globalstar SmartOne C
Globalstar SmartOne Solar

Duplex data modems
SPOT Trace
SPOT Gen4
SPOT X

Duplex voice/data modules
Globalstar GSP-1620
Globalstar GSP-1720

Services
Voice Telephony
One-way mobile terminated SMS text messaging
9,600 bit/s circuit switched data calls (Direct Dial-Up)
9,600 bit/s packet switched Internet access (Direct Internet)
One-way mobile originated short-burst messages (simplex devices only)
Two-way mobile originated / mobile terminated short-burst messages (SPOT X device only)
Device geolocation within approximately 30 km

Discontinued Products and Services
Sat-Fi2 (Satellite WiFi Hotspot) and Sat-Fi2 RAS (Remote Antenna Station)
72 kbit/s packet switched Internet access (on 2nd-gen WCDMA network)

System architecture

Gateways 
Globalstar satellites are simple "bent pipe" analog repeaters, unlike Iridium.

A network of ground gateway stations provides connectivity from the 40 satellites to the public switched telephone network and Internet.  A satellite must have a Gateway station in view to provide service to any users.  Twenty four Globalstar Gateways are located around the world, including seven in North America.  Globalstar Gateways are the largest cellular base station in the world with a design capacity for over 10,000 concurrent phone calls over a coverage area that is roughly 50% of the size of the US.  Globalstar supports CDMA technology such as the rake receiver and soft handoffs, so a handset may be talking via two spot beams to two Gateways for path diversity.

Globalstar users are assigned telephone numbers on the North American Numbering Plan in North America or the appropriate telephone numbering plan for the country that the overseas gateway is located in, except for Brazil, where the official Globalstar country code (+8818) is used.  The use of gateway ground stations provides customers with localized regional phone numbers for their satellite handsets. But service cannot be provided in remote areas (such as areas of the South Pacific and the polar regions) if there are no gateway stations to cover the area.  As of May 2012, voice and full-duplex data services are currently non-functional over much of Africa, the South Asian subcontinent, and most mid-ocean regions due to the lack of nearby gateway earth stations.

The Globalstar system uses the Qualcomm CDMA air interface; however, the Ericsson and Telit phones accept standard GSM SIM cards, while the Qualcomm GSP-1600/1700 phones do not have a SIM card interface, but use CDMA/IS-41 based authentication. Therefore, the Globalstar gateways need to support both the CDMA/IS-41 and the GSM standards.

Globalstar has roaming agreements with local cellular operators in some regions, enabling the use of a single phone number in satellite and cellular mode on multi-mode Globalstar handsets. These cellular roaming agreements are not in place in North America. Because of improvements in cellular phones and networks and the limitations inherent to satellite phones, the newest Globalstar handset (released in 2006) does not include cellular connectivity as Globalstar does not expect subscribers to carry it as their only mobile phone.

First Generation Satellites 
Globalstar orbits have an inclination of 52 degrees. Therefore, Globalstar does not cover polar areas, due to the lower orbital inclination.

Globalstar orbits have an orbital height of approximately 1400 km and latency is still relatively low (approximately 60ms).

A Globalstar satellite has two body-mounted, Earth-facing arrays. First-generation Globalstars weigh approximately 550 kg. However, the second-generation Globalstar design will gain significant mass.

In 2005, some of the satellites began to reach the limit of their operational lifetime of 7.5 years.  In December 2005, Globalstar began to move some of its satellites into a graveyard orbit above LEO.

First-generation satellite problems 
According to documents filed with the SEC on January 30, 2007, Globalstar's previously identified problems with its S-band amplifiers used on its satellites for two-way communications are occurring at a higher rate than expected, possibly eventually leading to reduced levels of two-way voice and duplex data service in 2008.  The company's simplex data services used to support the asset tracking products as well as the SPOT Satellite Messenger are not affected by the S-band satellite issue mentioned above. Globalstar also launched eight ground spare satellites in 2007 to help reduce the impact of the issue.

In the filing, Globalstar made the following statements:

Industry analysts speculate the problem is caused by radiation exposure the satellites receive when they pass through the South Atlantic Anomaly in their 876-mile (1414 km) altitude orbits.

The S-band antenna amplifier degradation does not affect adversely the Company's one-way "Simplex" data transmission services, which utilize only the L-band uplink from a subscriber's "Simplex" terminal to the satellites.

The Company is working on plans, including new products and services and pricing programs, and exploring the feasibility of accelerating procurement and launch of its second-generation satellite constellation, to attempt to reduce the effects of this problem upon its customers and operations.  The Company will be able to forecast the duration of service coverage at any particular location in its service area and intends to make this information available without charge to its service providers, including its wholly owned operating subsidiaries, so that they may work with their subscribers to reduce the impact of the degradation in service quality in their respective service areas. The Company is also reviewing its business plan in light of these developments.

The Company's liquidity remains strong.  At December 31, 2006, in addition to its credit agreement, the Company had unrestricted cash on hand and undrawn amounts under the Thermo Funding Company irrevocable standby stock purchase agreement of approximately $195 million.

Globalstar's interim solution to premature first-generation satellite problems 
In 2007, Globalstar launched eight spare satellites for its existing constellation with a view to reducing the gaps in its two-way voice and data services pending commercial availability of its second-generation satellite constellation. Globalstar continued to operate its failing satellite constellation to provide and support services on an intermittently-available until the second-generation Globalstar satellites became available for service.

Until the new second-generation Globalstar satellite constellation became operational, Globalstar offered its "Optimum Satellite Availability Tool" website, which subscribers could use to predict when one or more unaffected satellites would be overhead at a specific geographic location.

Second-generation satellites 
In December 2006, Globalstar announced that Alcatel Alenia Space, now Thales Alenia Space in its Cannes headquarters, has been awarded a €661 million contract for the second-generation constellation. The satellites were designed with a life expectancy of 15 years, significantly longer than the design life of Globalstar's first-generation constellation. The second- generation constellation will consist of 24 satellites.

In addition, Globalstar announced on April 3, 2007, that it has signed a €9 million agreement with Thales Alenia Space to upgrade the Globalstar satellite constellation, including necessary hardware and software upgrades to Globalstar's satellite control network facilities.

In August 2008, Thales Alenia Space began production assembly, integration, and testing of the second-generation flight model satellites, in its Rome factory, for launch as early as Q3 2009.

In July 2009, Globalstar, Inc. announced that it has received complete financing for its second-generation satellite constellation and signed an amendment to the initial contract, specifying in particular, the adjusted conditions for production and the new satellite delivery timetable.

The first six second-generation satellites were launched on October 19, 2010, from the Baikonur Cosmodrome in Kazakhstan. The launch used a Soyuz-2 launch vehicle with a Fregat upper stage. These second-generation satellites are expected to provide Globalstar customers with satellite voice and data services until at least 2025. Six more second-generation satellites were launched in July 2011 followed by another six satellites in December 2011.

The launch of the second-generation  constellation was completed on February 6, 2013, with the launch of the final six satellites using a Soyuz 2-1a launch vehicle. The 24 second-generation spacecraft weighed approximately  each at launch, and are 3-axis stabilized.

In February 2022, it was announced that Globalstar purchased 17 new satellites to continue its constellation built by MDA and Rocket Lab for $327 million. The satellites are expected to be launched by 2025.

On June 19, 2022, a backup satellite for Globalstar was launched on a Falcon 9 rocket. This was the first Globalstar satellite to launch in over 9 years. Prior to the launch, Globalstar did not announce the mission, besides a vague quarterly report stating the satellite would launch.

Business operations

Corporate structure and financing 
Predecessor Company - Globalstar LP.  In February 1995, Globalstar Telecommunications Ltd. raised $200 million from its initial public offering in the NASDAQ market. The IPO price of $20 per share was equivalent to $5 per share after two stock splits. The stock price peaked at (post-split) $50 per share in January 2000, but institutional investors began predicting bankruptcy as early as June 2000. The stock price eventually fell below $1 per share, and the stock was delisted by NASDAQ in June 2001.

After the IPO, the publicly traded Globalstar Telecommunications (NASDAQ symbol GSTRF) owned part of system operator Globalstar LP. From that point on, the primary financing for Globalstar LP was vendor financing from its suppliers (including Loral and Qualcomm), supplemented by junk bonds.

After a total debt and equity investment of $4.3 billion, on February 15, 2002, Globalstar Telecommunications filed for Chapter 11 bankruptcy protection, listing assets of $570 million and liabilities of $3.3 billion. The assets were later bought for $43 million by Thermo Capital Partners LLC.

Globalstar LLC and Globalstar, Inc.  When the new Globalstar emerged from bankruptcy in April 2004, it was owned by Thermo Capital Partners (81.25%) and the original creditors of Globalstar L.P. (18.75%).  Globalstar LLC was incorporated in April 2006 to become Globalstar, Inc.

Globalstar, Inc. completed an IPO in November 2006.  The stock currently trades on the NASDAQ Global Select Market under the symbol GSAT.

SPOT LLC 
In August 2007, Globalstar announced the introduction of the SPOT Satellite Messenger product, to be marketed through its latest subsidiary SPOT, Inc., later named SPOT LLC. The SPOT Messenger is manufactured by Globalstar partner Axonn LLC and combines the company's simplex data technology with a Nemerix GPS chipset. SPOT is intended to leverage Globalstar's still adequate L-Band uplink, which is used by simplex modems. The product was launched in early November 2007. Subsequent launches included the SPOT Trace, SPOT X with Bluetooth and Gen4.

Collaboration with Apple, Inc. 
Globalstar provides the infrastructure for the Emergency SOS via satellite functionality introduced in all versions of the iPhone 14 and iPhone 14 Pro. Globalstar reserves 85% of its network capacity for the service, and previous to the announcement of the service, Globalstar invested in expanding its infrastructure, including "material upgrades to Globalstar’s ground network to enhance redundancy and coverage" and "construction of 10 new gateways around the world". In February 2023, GlobalStar announced it would be repaying a $150 million debt under a 2019 agreement to EchoStar, which could have prevented the Apple partnership.

Employees 
The first five employees of Globalstar were transferred from the founding companies in 1991. Although few figures were publicly disclosed, the company apparently reached a peak of about 350 employees until layoffs in March 2001. However, this figure was misleading, as most of the development, operations, and sales employees were employed by the company's strategic partners.

The company then appointed satellite telecommunications veteran Olof Lundberg to lead a turnaround at the company to serve as chairman and CEO. After beginning his career with Swedish Telecom, Lundberg had been founding Director General (later CEO) of Inmarsat from 1979 to 1995. He served as founding CEO and later CEO and Chairman of ICO Global Communications from 1995 to 1999.

Lundberg resigned from the company (then in bankruptcy) on June 30, 2003.

David Kagan serves as the current CEO of Globalstar Inc.

See also 

 Mobile-satellite service
 Satellite phone
 Broadband Global Area Network
 Gonets
 ICO Satellite Management
 Inmarsat
 Iridium Satellite LLC
 O3b Networks
 SkyWave Mobile Communications
 Starlink
 Teledesic
 TerreStar
 Thuraya
 Thales Alenia Space
 Orbcomm

References

External links 

Companies listed on NYSE American
Companies that filed for Chapter 11 bankruptcy in 2002
Mobile phone companies of the United States
Satellite telephony
Communications satellite operators
Companies established in 1998
Qualcomm
Loral Space & Communications
Spacecraft launched by Soyuz-FG rockets
Spacecraft launched by Soyuz-2 rockets
2006 initial public offerings
Satellites in low Earth orbit